Loose Tails is the first collection of the comic strip series Bloom County by Berkeley Breathed.  It was published by Little, Brown and Company in 1983. At least two different editions exist; the contents and front cover art are identical but later editions swapped out the serious author biography on the back cover for a parody one.

It is followed by Toons For Our Times.

Synopses of major story lines

 Senator Bedfellow faces some antagonism when visiting Bobbi Harlow's fourth-grade classroom.  "How'd you launder the Libyan kickback money, Senator Bedfellow?"  (p1, 4 strips)
 Steve Dallas takes Bobbi Harlow on a date, in his gold Jeep with a license plate that spells out "HORNY".  (p3, 3 strips)
 Cutter John rolls into Bloom County, sweeping Bobbi Harlow off her feet both literally and figuratively.  (p6, 6 strips)
 Santa Claus visits Milo, and describes his recent labor trouble.  After Santa's elves go on strike, the president fires them and replaces them with out-of-work air traffic controllers.  (p10, 9 strips)
 Otis Oracle is named Grand Wizard of the local Moral Majority chapter.  (p16, 3 strips)
 Milo works as waiter at the county New Year's Eve party.  (p18, 6 strips)
 Prince Charles and Princess Di discuss baby names.  "Prince Butch."  (p22, 3 strips)
 Milo, in his capacity as Bloom Beacon reporter, harasses Senator Bedfellow.  (p23, 5 strips)
 Opus is introduced as Binkley's new pet.  (p27, 3 strips)
 Milo and Binkley organize a nuclear weapons protest demonstration, and visit a college campus to recruit.  (p29, 5 strips)
 Milo is arrested for giving a school report on penguin evolution.  Penguin evolution versus "scientific penguinism" is debated in the subsequent Penguin Trial.  (p34, 7 strips)
 Major Bloom is harassed by the house cockroaches.  (p39, 3 strips)
 The Rolling Stones visit Bloom County to play the school dance, causing consternation among the Moral Majority.  (p41, 8 strips)
 Cutter John meets Bobbi Harlow's mother.  (p46, 2 strips)
 Binkley's father takes Binkley hunting.  (p49, 4 strips)
 Milo tries to dig dirt on Senator Bedfellow.  "Will you confirm that you sunk Jimmy Hoffa in your backyard pond?"  (p51, strips)
 Everyone dons radiation masks following a leak at the Bloom County nuclear power plant.  Milo sings the "Split-Atom Blues" with the critters, who have been advised to avoid breathing until Tuesday.  (p57, 5 strips)
 Opus is accidentally sent to the dog pound, where he shares a prison cell with a switchblade-wielding canine.  (p59, 4 strips)
 The Bloom County neighborhood baseball game shows Binkley to be an incompetent pitcher, and Cutter John an overconfident shortstop.  (p70, 6 strips)
 A town meeting is called to propose a nuclear arms freeze.  (p74, 4 strips)
 The revolting Bill the Cat is introduced as a marketing ploy.  "Start looking for 'Bill the Cat' shirts, tote bags, mugs, toys, wallpaper, lunch pairs and toilet seat covers."  (p79)
 Quiche Lorraine, Bobbi Harlow's cousin, is introduced when Bobbi sets her up with Steve Dallas.  (p82, 4 strips)
 Opus and the critters take over a KFC, outraged that birds are being served as food.  "Sir, some of my best friends are chickens."  (p87, 3 strips)
 Opus's relatives in the Falklands are caught in and confused by the war.  (p89, 4 strips)
 The gang goes to see "Space Raiders of the Lost Extraterrestrial Shark" at the local theater.  "No flightless seabirds admitted under the age of two."  (p93, 5 strips)
 Prince Charles teaches his new son the ways of monarchy.  (p96, 3 strips)
 Steve Dallas substitute-teaches Bobbi Harlow's class, and takes them on a field trip to a bar to "observe the human condition".  (p98, 6 strips)
 Milo shoots his first low-budget film, "E.P. - The Extraterrestrial Penguin" starring Opus as E.P., Binkley as the Boy, and Quiche Lorraine as a giant alien cucumber.  (p102, 4 strips)
 Milo and Binkley form a band and rock out.  Binkley gets carried away.  (p104, 5 strips)
 Milo's Meadow is leased for oil exploration.  (p107, 3 strips)
 Opus gets work as the Bloom Beacon's film critic, thanks to his extensive vocabulary:  "Flop". "A disaster".  "Terminally putrid".  (p109, 3 strips)
 Steve Dallas again attempts to win Bobbi Harlow's affections, even going so far as to compose a love sonnet:  "In my dreams / you're all I sees / Boobs, butt, and knees / Be my main squeeze."  (p121, 5 strips)
 Blondie is introduced, and immediately captures Binkley's heart.  He asks her out to see Pink Floyd The Wall, and the critters show up as chaperones.  (p129, 9 strips)
 Milo directs the school's Christmas pageant, with Opus starring as a cow.  (p140, 5 strips)
 Milo again works as waiter at the Bloom County New Year's party.  Opus is a surprisingly effective bouncer.  (p146, 6 strips)

References 

Bloom County
Books by Berkeley Breathed
Little, Brown and Company books
1983 books